Five (stylised as 5ive) are a British boy band from London consisting of members Sean Conlon, Ritchie Neville, and Scott Robinson. They were formed in 1997 by the same team that managed the Spice Girls before they launched their career. The group were mostly known as a five-piece, consisting of Robinson, Neville, Conlon, Abz Love and Jason "J" Brown. Five enjoyed moderate success worldwide, particularly in their native United Kingdom, as well as most of the rest of Europe and Asia.

According to the British Phonographic Industry (BPI), Five has been certified for 1.6 million albums and 2.8 million singles in the UK. The group sold around 20 million copies worldwide.

They split up on 27 September 2001. Robinson, Love, Neville, and Brown briefly reformed the group without Conlon (who departed before their 2001 split) in September 2006, with a new management team headed by music manager Richard Beck. Eight months later, having secured a lucrative tour but failing to gain enough record company interest, Five made an announcement via their official website that they would again disband.

In 2012, the group announced that they were planning another reunion, this time with Conlon on board. Lead singer Brown initially agreed to take part in the reunion, but later changed his mind, claiming that he no longer wanted to be in the public eye. The group continued with only four members, but decided to keep the name Five. Alongside Blue, 911, Atomic Kitten, B*Witched, Honeyz and Liberty X, Five were featured in the ITV2 documentary series The Big Reunion, which began airing on 31 January 2013. This was followed by a comeback performance at the Hammersmith Apollo on 26 February 2013 and an arena tour around the UK and Ireland in May, which was their first ever tour without Brown. In November and December 2013, Five headlined their own tour, the 5ive Greatest Hits Tour, their first solo tour as a four-piece. In August 2014, Love announced his departure from the band via a tweet, leaving Conlon, Neville and Robinson to continue as a trio.

In 2021, Five officially released their first single in 20 years, "Keep On Movin" (21 Remix), which they released in June, followed by "Making Me Fall" and "Shangri-La" in August 2021, then "Reset" and "Warm Light" in October 2021. A single titled "Time" was released in November 2021. In December 2021, Five officially announced a release date of 28 January 2022 for their long-awaited fourth album Time.

Career

1997–1998: Formation and 5ive
In 1997, an advertisement was placed in the UK performing arts newspaper The Stage, asking for young male singers/dancers to audition for a boy band-style group with "attitude and edge". Bob and Chris Herbert, the two men who had earlier created the Spice Girls, thought the time was right for a male group. Over 3,000 hopefuls auditioned, including Russell Brand, who performed Extreme's song "More Than Words" for the judges. They were finally narrowed down to only 14, five of whom had arranged themselves into a group while waiting for their audition. The auditions resulted in a provisional casting of nine members: Richard Breen (now better known as Abz Love), Ritchie Neville, Scott Robinson, Sean Conlon, Jason "J" Brown, and stand-by members Peter Cheshire, Paul Taylor, Anthony Baker (rapper) and Ric Hershon. Because his first name was Richard, Breen created the nickname 'Abs' (from his middle name, "Abidin") to avoid confusion with Neville (born Richard Neville Dobson). Cheshire and Taylor were later cut when the final five were chosen in May 1997 and Hershon could not attend the final selection. Baker made it into the band originally, but doubt was cast over his rapping style as his North East accent came through.

The group were subsequently signed by Simon Cowell and BMG/RCA for a six-album deal. Five practiced and demoed their work at Trinity Studios in Knaphill – the same place the Spice Girls did a few years previously. In November 1997, Five released their debut single "Slam Dunk (Da Funk)", which debuted at number 10 in the UK Singles Chart. The song was also released in the U.S. in 1998 but had little chart success, reaching number 86 on the Billboard Hot 100, although it was chosen as the NBA's new theme song. In 1998, Five earned their first major international hit, "When the Lights Go Out", which cracked the U.S. top 10 and earned Gold status there soon after. Five then went on an eight-day tour to promote their upcoming album, appearing in a concert special for the Disney Channel with Irish girl group B*Witched, in Times Square in New York City and on MTV's TRL. The debut album 5ive peaked at number 27 in the U.S. Billboard 200 and topped the charts in other countries worldwide, including the UK. A lesser known fact is that there was a 6th member of the group 5ive. Danny Want, was released pre-signing of the first album deal, for reasons unknown to him. The dispute remains unsettled to this day. 

"It's the Things You Do" was released in late 1998 in the U.S., only to receive a lukewarm reception. The group embarked upon a U.S. tour with the American boy band NSYNC, but soon after pulled out due to exhaustion, flying back to England to rest and start work on a new album. Still from the first album, "Got the Feelin'", "Everybody Get Up", and "Until the Time Is Through" were all released as singles in the UK throughout 1998. Five reached the top 5 in several countries around the world, and the latter two singles each rose to the number two spot in the UK. A significant element in Five's popularity was their resemblance to groups such as New Kids on the Block, East 17, the Backstreet Boys and NSYNC in their uptempo musical style and 'street' image, in contrast to Take That, Boyzone, and 98 Degrees, who at the time were primarily known for their ballads. Five also wrote or co-wrote the majority of their songs, which was atypical of boy bands at the time.

Five were famously offered songs that turned out to be huge hits for Britney Spears and 'N Sync. In 1997, Max Martin was working on a new song entitled, "...Baby One More Time." It was originally written for the Backstreet Boys, and it was turned down. The song was then offered to TLC, who were also not interested. Simon Cowell heard the song and knew it would be a hit. He offered Martin an Aston Martin if Martin would give the song to his boy band, Five. Five initially began writing verses; however, Martin had promised the song to up-and-coming Britney Spears. In keeping his word, the finished song went to Britney. 

Per Cowell, "I got a call from Arista Records in America and they played me Hit Me Baby on the phone. I was like, “Oh my God, this is it” so I called Max Martin, who wrote it, and I said, “Max, I've just heard this demo. Please give it to me for Five”. And he went, “I can’t, I promised it to Britney Spears.” I went, “Who? Trust me, Max, nobody’s going to have a hit with a name like Britney Spears. Just think about it, please please please.” Twenty four hours later he came back and said “No, I’m going to give it to her”, and that was it." 

"But I think the point is, that song would have been a hit for anyone. I knew it would have been a hit for Five, it would have been a hit for TLC, it was a hit for Britney Spears. There have been country versions, alternative versions: it was just a hit song, no question about it, and having that first hit song is the most important part of an artist’s career, and also the most difficult part of breaking anyone's career." 

Five were later offered "Bye Bye Bye," by Martin with the only completed lyric being "ain't no lie baby, bye bye bye." Upon hearing the song and attempting to write verses, Robinson noted it sounded more like 'N Sync song than a Five song. The band subsequently passed on the song.

1999–2000: Invincible
In August 1999, the first single of their second album, Invincible, "If Ya Gettin' Down", was released and became a major hit worldwide but yet again failed to go to number 1 in their home country, kept out of the top spot by Ricky Martin. Finally, in October 1999, after three consecutive number-two peaks, "Keep on Movin'" became their first UK number 1, as well as their biggest selling single to date. The second album hit the top five shortly thereafter. "Don't Wanna Let You Go" was released in early March 2000, peaking at number 9. On 3 March 2000, Five opened at the BRIT Awards with rock legends Queen, performing an updated version of that band's hit, "We Will Rock You". That night Five won their first BRIT Award, as "Best Pop Act", and their cover of the Queen song went on to become their second number 1 in the UK in July 2000.

The first half of 2000 found Five on a successful world tour, performing concerts in the UK, Europe, Russia, Australasia and—as a foursome—South America, after Neville contracted chickenpox and had to be flown back to England. After finishing the tour, Five continued to perform at many concerts in the UK, including Party in the Park with Queen. A re-issue of Invincible included remixed versions of a couple of songs and five live tracks from their tour, as well as a bonus track, "Don't Fight It Baby". Due for release in July 2000 in the US, the song was pulled from release after the group was dropped by their stateside label, Arista Records. Five also had problems with their Asian record company, and subsequently cancelled their Asian tour. Suffering from this major blow, the lads headed back to the studio and started writing songs for their next album. They continued to win awards in the UK and Europe, and in December 2000 launched their second big tour, in their home country.

2001: Kingsize, Conlon's departure and split
In January 2001, Five went to perform at one of the biggest festivals in the world, Rock in Rio in Rio de Janeiro, to an audience of almost 500,000 people. In May 2001, after many months of creative writing and "developing their own personal sound", Kingsize was completed. When it was time to begin filming the video for their first single off the album, however, Conlon was unable to appear as he was suffering from a mental breakdown from stress caused by being part of the group. This was not publicly revealed at the time, however, and it was claimed he was ill from glandular fever instead. The "Let's Dance" video was released with a life-size cardboard cut-out standing in for the singer, and rumours that he had in fact left the band had to be quashed. Robinson also needed a time temporarily to be with his son, Brennan Rhys, who was born premature.

The remaining three members, Brown, Love and Neville pressed on with heavy promotion of the group's third album and the "Let's Dance" single. Whilst performing at a concert in Belgium in July, Neville tore the tendons in his left foot, putting a halt to all promotion and prompting the group to have a few meetings to re-think their options and future. "Let's Dance" was released in mid August 2001, however, and became their third UK number one, holding the top spot for two weeks. Kingsize debuted two weeks later at number three, and went on to achieve Gold status. Two weeks after the release of Kingsize, the band announced Conlon's departure. Neville said in an interview several years later that the band's management kept Conlon's departure from the band a secret, so they were not aware that he had left when they filmed the "Let's Dance" video.

On 27 September 2001, after a month of serious meetings with record management, the band announced on MTV Select that it would split after releasing a compilation later that year. The following day, Robinson married his fiancé, Kerry Oaker, at a ceremony with all of his former bandmates in attendance. Years later, Breen revealed he was strongly against the idea of splitting up; he described the break-up as feeling something had been taken from him. On 19 November a Greatest Hits album was released with 15 past hits, two remixes and one new song. On 24 November, a double-A-side single with "Closer to Me" and "Rock the Party" was released in United Kingdom with an animated video. The two songs were included on their previous album Kingsize, but after Conlon's departure, they decided to release as a single from their Greatest Hits album. The album was released on United States on 15 February 2002. In the band's short life-span, they experienced success around the world, racking up three number-one singles in the UK and selling an estimate of 15-20 million copies of their records worldwide, including 7 million copies of their albums worldwide and 2 million in the United States, and picking up numerous awards along the way.

2006–2007: First reunion
On 17 September 2006, an announcement was made via Five's official Myspace page that a press conference was to be held at The Scala in central London on 27 September. After a venue change due to a shooting at The Scala, the conference was moved to the Bar Academy Islington. It was confirmed at the press conference that four of the five members would be reuniting (Conlon now being committed to his Sony deal). Five recorded new material for what was to be their fourth studio album, working with Guy Chambers, Swedish producer/songwriter Anders Bagge, and French DJs Trak Invaders. They also planned to tour in 2007. By January 2007, Five had completed half of their album and were looking to be signed to a record label with new manager, Richard Beck, who also secured an MTV documentary series titled Five - The Revive. The album was expected to be released within the next few months. On 8 March 2007, at midnight, Five premiered one-minute clips of three brand new songs that were to have been on the new album. The songs, titled "70 Days", "Settle Down" and "It's All Good" can be heard on the band's official website and also on their Myspace page. On 19 May 2007, only eight months after reforming and having failed to secure a lucrative enough record deal, 5ive announced via their website that they would no longer be pursuing a comeback.

2012–2021: Second reunion and Love's departure
In 2012, Conlon reunited with his former bandmates to discuss the possibility of a second reunion. Brown initially was willing to take part in the reunion, but the other members preferred to continue as a four-piece, after the psychological problems caused by him to Conlon in the past. The return was announced on 18 October. In 2013, the group took part in The Big Reunion, where they talked about their time together and the difficulties that came with being in a band. They thought about adding a new fifth member, but gave up. The group auditioned three men to become the new member of the band, but in the end the plan for a fifth member was dropped and Five decided to continue as a four-piece. Brown eventually appeared on The Big Reunion: On Tour to deny the accusations made by his bandmates in September 2013. He acknowledged his behaviour could have been seen as loud and overbearing, but he denied bullying Conlon.

On 16 September 2013, the band picked up the award for Best Music Act (On a Reality TV Show) at the National Reality TV Awards. In November and December 2013, Five embarked on their own tour in UK and Australia, the 5ive Greatest Hits Tour. In March 2014, it was rumored that Love had quit the group, but at the time they denied it. In June 2014, Five supported McBusted on four dates of their McBusted Tour and later that month Love stated that the group's future was uncertain. Love eventually announced that he had left the group in August 2014 via Twitter, without telling the other members beforehand. In an interview a few days before the announcement, Love revealed that he only agreed to reunite with Five because of financial necessity, and was not happy singing teen songs again.

In February 2016, Five released the compilation Keep On Movin' – The Best of Five, their first release as a trio.

In April 2019, the boys announced they would be joined by 911, Damage and A1 for a tour of the UK called The Boys Are Back! in 2020. Robinson also stated that there was no chance of the band's original full line-up returning. He told the Press Association: "It wouldn't be down to us to reach out to [Brown and Love]. They've made it very clear they didn't want to be in the band. It's like Take That, with Jason Orange and Robbie Williams leaving. It still works, the songs are still the same." The tour would be interrupted by the COVID-19 pandemic, with shows being rescheduled for 2021.

2021–present: Rebranding and Time
In late 2020, Five announced they would be embarking on another Australian Greatest Hits tour in 2021 supported by Australian pop duo Sister2Sister. On 4 June 2021, after a series of hints and posts counting down, Five unveiled a new logo, cover artwork for "Keep On Movin" (21 Remix) along with a clip, which they announced was available for pre-order on Apple Music. They also stated to watch their social media accounts for bigger news on 11 June 2021.

On 11 June, the remix was released with the announcement of a new album recorded during the pandemic. On 26 July 2021, Five announced two new singles titled "Shangri-La" and "Making Me Fall" that would be available for pre-order on 31 July 2021, then released on all streaming platforms on 6 August 2021. On 29 July 2021 a snippet of each song was posted to their social media accounts. On 2 September 2021, Five announced the album to be released around Christmas. On 12 September 2021 during the Cardiff show of The Boys Are Back Tour they debuted a live rendition of a ballad called "Reset", which was released alongside the single "Warm Light" on 1 October 2021.

In October 2021, Five announced the upcoming album would be called Time and was due for release around January 2022. The next single from the album would also be called "Time" and would be made available for pre-order on 22 October 2021 setting a release date for 26 November 2021. In December 2021 an official look at the new album cover was given alongside a pre-save link for their new album "Time". The album was released on 28 January 2022.

Members

Current members
 Scott Robinson (1997–2001, 2006–2007, 2012–present)
 Ritchie Neville (1997–2001, 2006–2007, 2012–present)
 Sean Conlon (1997–2001, 2012–present)

Former members
 Abz Love (1997–2001, 2006–2007, 2012–2014)
 J Brown (1997–2001, 2006–2007)

Timeline

Discography

 5ive (1998)
 Invincible (1999)
 Kingsize (2001)
 Time (2022)

Tours
Headlining
 Everybody Get Up with 5ive (1999)
 Invincible Tour (2000–2001)
 5ive Greatest Hits Tour (2013)
 Loud and Intimate Tour (2015)
 5ive Tour (2016–present)

Co-headlining
 The Big Reunion Tour  (2013)
 Christmas Party Tour  (2013)
 The Big Reunion: Boy Band Tour  (2014)
 The Boys Are Back Tour  (2020-2021)

Opening act
 McBusted Tour  (2014)

Awards
Awards won:

Brit Awards
 Best Pop Act – 2000

MTV Europe Music Awards
 The MTV Select Award – 1998

National Reality TV Awards
 Best Music Act (on a Reality TV Show) – 2013

Silver Clef Awards
 Best Newcomer – 2000

Smash Hits Poll Winners Party
 Best New Act – 1997
 Best Haircut (Scott Robinson) – 1997, 1998, 1999
 Best British Band – 1998, 1999, 2000
 Best Album – 1998
 Best Cover – 1998

TMF Awards (Netherlands)
 Best Single – 2000
 Best Album – 2000
 Best International Group – 2000

TV Hits Awards
 Best New Band – 1999
 Best Single ("We Will Rock You" (Queen cover)) – 2000

See also

List of 1990s one-hit wonders in the United States
List of UK Singles Chart number ones of the 1990s
List of UK Singles Chart number ones of the 2000s

References

External links
 

Brit Award winners
English pop music groups
Boy bands
English boy bands
English vocal groups
Teen pop groups
Musical groups from London
Musical groups established in 1997
Musical groups disestablished in 2001
Musical groups reestablished in 2006
Musical groups disestablished in 2007
Musical groups reestablished in 2013

MTV Europe Music Award winners
Bertelsmann Music Group artists
RCA Records artists
Arista Records artists